George de Fretes (1921-1981) was a musician from Indonesia who found fame in the Netherlands. Like his fellow countrymen Ming Luhulima and Rudi Wairata, he found sizable popularity in the Netherlands and Europe playing Hawaiian music.

Background
De Fretes came from the Maluku Islands, Indonesia and was born 23 December 1921 in Bandung. He was married to Joyce Aubrey and together they had a daughter Wanda, who was born in Bandung, Indonesia in 1946 and became a recording artist, like her musical parents. By 1952, de Fretes and Aubrey had divorced and she had moved to the Netherlands, taking their daughter Wanda with her. Aubrey joined The Mena Moeria Minstrels as their singer. The group was headed by Ming Luhulima. It is believed that de Fretes stowed away on a ship called the Johan van Oldenbarnevelt and arrived in the Netherlands around 1958.

Death
De Fretes died on 19 November 1981. He is buried in Forest Lawn Memorial Park cemetery, Los Angeles County, California. He is buried next to his idol Sol Hoʻopiʻi.

Career
De Fretes was a multi instrumentalist. In addition to the steel guitar, he also played guitar, violin, trumpet and saxophone. He became a popular artist in the Netherlands, and like Luhulima, gained his fame there. 
Along with Luhulima he was responsible for the Portuguese style or genre of music in the Netherlands called Kroncong becoming well known. He is also credited with teaching Rudi Wairata techniques on the steel guitar.

In 1960, he released an EP record on the Fontana label that featured the song "Ou' OelateZ". The record also featured Joyce Aubrey and Bill Toma on vocals. In 1966, he joined the Tielman Brothers and went on tour with them. He also recorded an album with Frank Valdor in 1966. Later he left to settle in the United States permanently. Around 1970 or 1971, Hula Girl was released on the Eclipse label. This was a re-release of an earlier album, Aloha Keakua that was released on the Omega label.

In September 2010, his daughter Wanda took a trip from California to the third Chanos International Steel Guitar Festival aka CISGF which was held in Chanos-Curson, France, to receive a posthumous European Steel Guitar Hall of Fame award for her father.

LP Discography

References

External links
 The Legend George De Fretes Music Record
 Indo-Rock-Gallery - George de Fretes
 Blues Harmonica site: Hawaiian muziek met o.a de Kilima Hawaiians en George de Fretes 
 Driwan Music Record Cybernuseun: The Legend George De Fretes Music Record

Indonesian musicians
Indonesian emigrants to the Netherlands
1921 births
1981 deaths